Tegan Alyce Philip (née Caldwell; born 3 September 1988) is a retired Australian Netball player, who for her entire professional career played for the Melbourne Vixens in the ANZ Championship and Suncorp Super Netball competitions.

Netball career
During the early stages of her career, Philip was described as the new Sharelle McMahon (the former Diamonds captain) because of her agility in the circle, vertical leap, and accurate eye. Her career began in the seaside town of Anglesea in Victoria for the Bellarine Netball Association when she was coached by her mother and father. She was regularly chosen for most representative teams for the area.

However, it wasn't until she was playing senior netball that she started to get noticed in netball circles. Netball had all but consumed Tegan, playing locally on Saturday and then long trips for extremely late Wednesday night state league, with training in between, there wasn't room for too much else. During her time at the then Hume City Falcons under coach Marg Lind and playing alongside former Australian Netballer, Nicole Richardson is where she made her mark. Pick-up by Victoria, she made an impact at the national competition earning her a position in the Australia U/21 for the 2009 World Youth Championships. An unfortunate injury to the teams starting GA, Tegan was provided with an opportunity. Holding her nerves she was able to help lead Australia to victory against New Zealand in the Cook Islands. A stellar performance in the Grand Final netted her a chance to train with the Melbourne Vixens. Through her hard work dedication, she made her dream a reality.

More recently she was part of the successful Commonwealth Games squad that brought home the gold medal from Glasgow 2014. She was selected in the Australian Diamonds squad for the 2018/19 international season. She ended her professional netball career in October 2020, as the most-capped Vixen (131 games), all-time leading goalscorer (2,729 goals) and a participant of the Melbourne Vixens team that won their third premiership.

Personal life
A devout Christian, she has stated that her faith is crucial to her approach to life. She has been married to Joshi Philip since 22 February 2015.

References

1988 births
Living people
ANZ Championship players
Melbourne Vixens players
Commonwealth Games gold medallists for Australia
Netball players at the 2014 Commonwealth Games
Commonwealth Games medallists in netball
Australia international netball players
Suncorp Super Netball players
Victorian Netball League players
Netball players from Victoria (Australia)
Australia international Fast5 players
Victorian Fury players
Australian Netball League players
Medallists at the 2014 Commonwealth Games